Adela Demetja (born 1984 in Tirana) is an Albanian independent art curator.

Since 2010, she has been the art director of the Tirana Art Lab – Centre for Contemporary Art, located in Tirana, Albania.  Previously, she was working as an art production manager.

Education
Demetja graduated with a Masters in Curatorial and Critical Studies from the Städelschule and the Goethe University Frankfurt, both located in Frankfurt am Main, Germany.

Demetja is also trained as a painter and has studied fine arts at the Academy of Arts in Tirana, located in Tirana, and at the College of Design, located in Karlsruhe, Germany.

Career
As one of the founders of the Tirana Art Lab – Centre for Contemporary Art, she has curated various contemporary art exhibitions in different venues around Tirana.

Since 2014, the organization operates from a multifunctional exhibition space located in the centre of Tirana. The space also hosts an open library of English, Albanian and Italian reference books, artists' catalogues, publications on art theory and criticism, as well as a selection of international art magazines. Access to the library is open to the public.

Activity 
2007–2008 – As a fellow of the Robert Bosch Foundation in the "Culture Manager from Central and Eastern Europe", Demetja worked as a guest curator at the Lothringer 13 – Städtische Kunsthalle München. She curated a number of international exhibitions and events in different European countries.

Exhibitions 
Among the artists Demetja has featured in solo exhibitions are:

 Damir Ocko
 Armando Lulaj

Thematic exhibitions she has curated include:

 2009 – Feedback 1989 (with Roland Albrecht, Stephan Balkenhol, Nikolin Bujari, Uroš Djuric, Jakup Ferri, Driton Hajredini, Julia Kissina, Ledia Kostandini, Petrit Kumi, Armando Lulaj, Istvan Laszlo, Jin Lie, Peggy Meinfelder, Anke Mila Menck, Beatrice Minda, Juli Ndoci, Alketa Ramaj, Albrecht Schäfer, Zuzanna Skiba, Kamen Stoyanov, Gabriela Volanti)
 2012 – The Aesthetic of the Small Act (with Armando Lulaj, Att Poomtangon, Jens Haaning, Karmelo Bermejo, Flaka Haliti, Lana Cmajcanin)
 2012 – Voices of Truth (with Adrian Paci, Ibro Hasanovic, Damir Ocko)

Personal life
Demetja lives and works between Tirana and Frankfurt am Main.

See also 

 Albanian art
 List of Albanian painters
 List of people from Frankfurt
 List of people from Tirana

References 
  bksh.al
Exhibition of Damir Ocko -   www.lothringer13.de
Feedback 1989 Exhibition -   Wordpress.com
Adriatic Region in Focus -   Labforculture.org
Blood Feuds Text -

External links 
Exhibition of Armando Lulaj 
  labforculture.org
  worldcat.org
abebooks.co.uk

Date of birth missing (living people)
1984 births
20th-century Albanian painters
21st-century Albanian painters
Albanian expatriates in Germany
Art directors
European art curators
Founders
Goethe University Frankfurt alumni
People from Karlsruhe
People from Tirana
Living people
Albanian curators
Albanian women curators
Women founders
Albanian women painters
20th-century women artists
21st-century women artists
Women graphic designers